Daphne Liliana Heyaime Fernández (born 13 April 1998) is a Dominican footballer who plays as a forward for the Dominican Republic women's national team.

International career
Heyaime has appeared for the Dominican Republic at the 2020 CONCACAF Women's Olympic Qualifying Championship qualification.

References

External links

1998 births
Living people
Sportspeople from Santo Domingo
Dominican Republic women's footballers
Women's association football forwards
Newberry College alumni
Dominican Republic women's international footballers
Dominican Republic expatriate women's footballers
Dominican Republic expatriate sportspeople in the United States
Expatriate women's soccer players in the United States